The following are places of worship in Cherupuzha:

St. Mary's Forane Church
St. Mary's Forane Church is one of the oldest houses of worship in Cherupuzha. This church, belonging to the Archdiocese of Tellicherry, was established in 1951 to take care of the spiritual needs of the Christians who migrated from south Kerala to Cherupuzha and the surrounding areas.
St. Mary's is about a kilometer from Cherupuzha. Most vehicles plying the Cherupuzha payyannur route make it a point to seek blessings at the grotto of Mother Mary on their first trip.

Cherupuzha Shri Ayyappa Temple
Cherupuzha Ayyappa temple is about 500 meters from Cherupuzha on Thirumeni Road, located on a hill top. Hailed as the Sabarimala of North Malabar, the Cherupuzha Ayyappa Temple is a premier Hindu pilgrim centre of North Malabar.

The temple originated as a Bhajan madh. In 1984, the first temple was built with cooperation from people of all communities. On 28 July 1984, the temple was sanctified into a mahakshetra during a ten-day mahotsava. Ubadeva temple annexes dedicated to Kshetra, Maha Ganapathi, Nagaraja, Sree Vishnumurthi, Sree Raktachamundi, Sree Muthappan, Sree Pottandaivam temple are situated around the main temple complex. There are five ubadeva temples here: Sree Ganapathi, Sree Nagaraja, Sree Muthappan, Sree Vishnumurthi, and Sree Raktha Chamundeshwaree and Sree Pottan Daivam.

The Temple Mahotsava is held every 10–17 December or 11-18. Along with the devotional facets of the Mahotsava, temple arts and entertainment bring together people of North Malabar. In addition to Mahotsava, Kalliyatam is held on Shivaratri and the day after.

Chathamangalam St. Jude's Chapel (Near Thirumeni) 
St. Jude's Church, Chathamangalam (Kannur) is an emerging pilgrim centre in Cherupuzha area. It is located at a distance of 10 kilometers from Cherupuzha via Thirumeni. The foundation stone of the church was laid by the present Cardinal of the Malankara Catholic Church, who was the Vicar General of the Bathery diocese then. 
Since the church is dedicated to St. Jude, the mediator for impossible matters, it attracts huge number of pilgrims. Situated at the convergence of two iconic hills in the area by name Thevarkunnumala and Alumbumala, the landscape near to the church is spectacular.

Jerusalem Marthoma Church 
Jerusalem Marthoma Church is located at 1 Kilometer away from Cherupuzha Town. This church was established in 1970 and in 1974 credited as a parish. The church was established under the able leadership of Rt. Rev. Thomas Mar Athanasius Episcopa, and a small group of Marthomites migrated from the southern part of Kerala. The church building was re-constructed in 2005. Today the church has become a burning light of Cherupuzha and is a great source of spiritual development as well as a great help to the common people in and around Cherupuzha. At present the church contains Thejus Child Development Centre, Marthoma Nursery School, a tailoring school and a de-addiction centre.

Mulapra Sree Dharmashastha Temple
Mulapra Sree Dharmashastha Temple 5 km away from Cherupuzha in Thirumeni road is a famous pilgrim centre of Hindus. About 100 Years before a group of Swami's who were going to Sabarimala conducted Bhajans in this place and later on Mulapra Ayyappa Bhajana Mandiram was formed. After many years on 2012 February the now Known temple came to existence. Mahaganapathi and lord ayyappa gives dharshana to a lot of people coming to this temple daily.

Muapra Sree kakkarakkavu Bhagavathi temple is situated in the same temple complex. Kakkara bhagavathi, vishnumoorthi, rakthachamundi and Nagaraja gives dharshan here.
The Temple Mahotsava is held every 13 January-January15 with much fan fare. Along with the devotional facets of the mahotsava, temple arts and entertainment bring together people of North Malabar. The temple is located in a wonderful place in mulapra where everyone feels a mindblowing experience once they reach here.

Pulingome Makhaam
Pulingome Makhaam 5 km away from Cherupuzha is a famous pilgrim centre of Muslims. About 1300 years ago, two holy men who had come for religious propagation were buried here. They were residing at Kadayakkara, near Pulingome. Every year Uroose festival is celebrated here in the month of March. Thousands of people of different caste and creed from north Kerala and Southern Karnataka reach this sacred place for Uroose festival. Mass dining of more than ten thousand people will be held as a part of the festival.

Kripalayam
Kripalayam Retreat Centre is a famous Christian pilgrim centre in north Kerala. It is located at around 1 km from Cherupuzha Town at kakkayamchal. On Tuesdays special prayers are being conducted. Large mass of people used to attend in these prayers.

Kottathalachi
Kottathalachi Mount is a famous Christian pilgrim centre in north Kerala. It is located at around 2500 feet above the sea level. On Good Friday of 1958, the holy cross was installed at "Kottathalachi Mala" by Fr. Mathew Mannuramparambil. Since then the first Sunday after Easter is being celebrated here by thousands of pilgrims every year. At present there is road facility till the base of the hill via Thabore.

Kottathalachi is known as the "Malayattoor of Malabar".

St. Joseph’s Church Pulingome
St. Joseph’s Church was built in 1954 by the Christians who migrated from Travancore. The church in its present form was built in the eighties. Kottathalachi mala is within the purview of Pulingome parish.

Baptist Church Kokkadavu
A peaceful place to share your problems and meditate in a devotional atmosphere.

Thalakaveri
At the convergence of the rivers Kaveri (or Cauvery), the underground Sujyothi and the Kanike, the Bhangandeshwara temple at Thalakaveri has a distinct Kerala touch. Thalakaveri is in Madekere district in Karnataka state and is about 30 km away from Cherupuzha. Most of the route is through dense Karnataka forest. The forest road leading to Thalakaveri (Bhagamandala) has no regular transport facilities. People usually take a long walk through the forest which is one of the great features of this pilgrimage.  Every 17 October, on Tulasankranama, hundreds of people from Kannur and Kasaragod come here to witness the waters of the Kaveri gushing out from its source. It is believed that Goddess Kaveri appears in the form of a spring at Thalakaveri, which is what causes the upsurge at the source.

Because of the three rivers, it is also called Triveni Sangama. The serene temple has intricate carvings and a copper roof. A dip at the Triveni Sangam nearby is supposed to revive sagging spirits. For this is Thalakavari (meaning Head of the Kaveri), the origin of one of the seven sacred rivers. The source of this long river, which passes through two states, is on the top of the hill called Brahmagiri. It is 1535 metres above sea level.

Narambil Bhagavathy
Narambil Bhagavathy originated from the famous Rayaramangalam Temple. The Theyyam was performed in the Kodakkal Koroth Tharavadu, Ramanthali, Muchilot temples, etc. as a Goddess with fiery anger against evil. At Narambil Tharavadu near Cherupuzha, the Theyyam has been performed peacefully. There is an interesting myth behind the origin of Narambil Bhagavathy.

One story says that this Amman (mother goddess) was originally a "Vana Durga", or "Forest Goddess". She was worshipped by a poor young lady who was married (by arrangement) to a very cruel and much older man who treated her terribly (a sad circumstance that many village girls may be sentenced to).

The young woman was nevertheless patient and longsuffering, with her only solace being her own devotion to Narambil Bhadrakali. At one point, this woman gave birth to a beautiful baby girl. After observing the proper post-partem protocols, this young lady went to take her newborn to Devi's temple, both to thank the goddess and bless the child. When she returned home, her cruel husband began to rage that his dinner was not ready, and he beat her savagely.

Bhagavathy, sensing what was happening, took her most terrible form: she was wreathed in flames and cobras, with a rutting elephant in one ear-ring, and a roaring tiger in the other. Her fangs were long like a lion's, her tusks curved like a boar's, and her three eyes blazed with brilliance. She had the sun and the moon in her hair, and 500 serpents woven into her braids. She rushed into the house and tore the evil husband into pieces, finally garlanding herself with his entrails (or, in some versions, tossing them into the boughs of her sacred tree).

A messenger from Muchilottu Bhagavathy arrived on the scene to calm the goddess down. She advised her to become peaceful, wash her face, and come to eat with her sisters. The people were much afraid, especially the young wife of the evil man (now deceased). Narambil Bhadrakali was moved by compassion, and so assumed a kind, peaceful form, transforming the dead-man's entrails into a flowering vine. She kept the young lady and her child with her as companions, and settled in the area as a goddess who would protect the weak from oppression.

Other religious centers in and around Cherupuzha
Edavaramba Vishnumurthy Temple, Kariyakkara Ara of Pottan Theyyam, Muchilottu Bhagawati Temple Vilakkuvettam, Chunda Thattummal Vishnumurthy Temple, Temple of Lord Shiv Ayannur, Kamballur Bhagavathi temple, Pulingome SankaraNarayana Swami Temple, Meenkulam Sreekrishna Temple

References

Religious buildings and structures in Kannur district